The R819 road is a regional interstate road in Dublin, Ireland.

The official definition of the R819 from the Roads Act 1993 (Classification of Regional Roads) Order 2006 states:

R819: Long Mile Road - Tallaght, County Dublin

Between its junction with R110 at Long Mile Road in the city of Dublin and its junction with N81 at Tallaght Bypass in the town of Tallaght in the county of South Dublin via Walkinstown Road in the city of Dublin: and Greenhills Road in the county of South Dublin.</p>

See also
Roads in Ireland
National secondary road
Regional road

References

Regional roads in the Republic of Ireland
Roads in County Dublin